This page aims to list articles related to the island of Ireland. This list is not necessarily complete or up to date; if you see an article that should be here but is not (or one that should not be here but is), please update the page accordingly.Recent changes: Irish topics

Architecture

Communications

Culture

Economy

Education

Food and beverages

Geography

Places

History

Ideologies

Law

Language

Media

Music

Nationhood

Officials

Politics

Religion

Science and technology

Sport

Transport

See also

Lists of country-related topics - similar lists for other countries

 
Outlines of countries